Bañado de los Pantanos is a municipality and village in the Arauco Department of La Rioja Province in northwestern Argentina.

References

Populated places in La Rioja Province, Argentina